Canary Lee Burton, is an American keyboardist, composer and writer.

Biography  
Burton was born on September 16, 1942, in Richmond, California.  In 1972 she moved to Moscow, Idaho, to attend the University of Idaho where she was one of the first women to be accepted into the music composition program. After passing her third-year piano exam, she left to form her own rock ’n roll band and play in various rock and jazz ensembles. She attracted followers through her gigs, but she came to find performance unfulfilling and turned to composition.

She relocated to Washington D.C., where she worked at WPFW Pacifica radio for three years. She then moved to Cape Cod, Massachusetts, where she established her own contemporary music radio show, The Latest Score, on WOMR in Provincetown. While founding and playing in various rock and jazz ensembles, Burton continued her studies—with Kevin Toney in jazz in 1980, with David Sussman in 1988, with John Zielinski in composition from 1990 to 1992, and briefly with Rodney Lister at the New England Conservatory in Boston, Massachusetts, in 1995. She worked as a music teacher from 1996 to 2000.

Selected pieces of her work were included in the published collection Music of Living Composers, compiled by the Campbell University piano professor and composer Betty Wishart in 1997. In 2013, Southern River was among the winners of the annual Search for New Music competition of the International Alliance for Women in Music.

Burton's works have been performed internationally. Her music, with information about her work, is archived in the Wellfleet Public Library in Massachusetts and in Italy in the library of the Fondazione Adkins Chiti: Donne in Musica . She is the recipient of an ASCAP Plus Award, which supports ASCAP members whose works have a unique prestige value for which adequate compensation would not otherwise be received. Some of her music from the 1970s, 1980s, and 1990s, may be heard online and the sheet music downloaded.

Selected works

 Sometime After One (1982), for piano
 Gaia Morning, Gaia Noon, Gaia Night (1987), for piano
 Costa Brava (1989), for piano
 Atlantic Sonata (1992), for piano
 The Promise (1993), for voice and piano
 Archeological Record (2008), for piano.
 Daniella’s Hope (2008), for piano four-hands
 Whispers (2011), for guitar
 String Theory (2011), for string orchestra
 Chopin Slept (2011), for piano trio
 In the Beginning, for organ
 A Green and Yellow Basket, for organ
 Solo Viola, for solo viola
 Clara Young, for voice and piano
 American Lullaby, for voice and piano
 Early in the Morning, for voice and piano
 The Tea Party: The Tea Party; Dancing with my Teddy; Playing Dress Up; Ad Hoc
 Folksong for My Mother piano
 Victoria's Harp, for piano
 Southern River, for cello and viola
 We Want to Pond Naked, for voice, flute, oboe, piano
 No More Violins, for violin and piano
 The Twelfth of Cold, for piano, viola, violin, clarinet, bass, cello, in three movements:  Fairy Boat; Snow Imp; Frost Heaves
 Viola Thinks 2, viola solo
 Sparcity, for viola, bass, flute, tuba
 Sri Rama, for piano
 Nightfall in the City, for piano and voice
 Refugee, for.guitar and voice
 Indian Voices, electroacoustic

One-minute pieces
 La Compara, for piano, trumpet and clarinet
 Cuban Love, for piano
 Dust Bunnies, for piano
 Minute Meld, electroacoustic
 Viola Thinks 1, for viola solo

Jazz
 Familiarity (1977), lead sheet, jazz, one instrument
 Meteor Shower (1977), jazz/instrumental
 Companion (2006), for jazz piano
 Companion, extended for bass, piano and flute
 Lulu's Rag, for jazz band
 Sinuosity, for flute, oboe, piano
 Solar Reflection, for jazz band
 Ya Gotta Be Kiddin, for piano
 Sigred's Lullaby, for piano
 Raggity Three Step, for piano
 Turkey Too
 Tritone Subrosa
 Monkish

Burton's music has been recorded and issued on CD, including:
 Piano Music from Cape Cod (Seabird Studio, 2003) Canary Burton, piano
 Women in Harmony (Tempus Floridum, 2010)
 Classical Bird: The Music of Canary Burton (2014)
 Jazz Bird (2014) Canary Burton, piano; Jarvis Trio
 Bird Notes (2014).
 Bird Song: Canary Burton and Friends
 Live at the Center (Roxana Bajdechi, pianist)
 Lou Lou and Bird: Soundpaintings 2012 (Canary Burton and Marylou Blakeslee)
 Lou Lou and Bird: Soundpaintings 2014 (Canary Burton and Marylou Blakeslee)

References

Further reading
 Burns, Kristine Helen. Women and Music in America Since 1900: An Encyclopedia. Westport CT: Greenwood Press, 2002, I: 312.
 "Canary Burton." Interview in Music Notez, http://www.muzicnotez.com/magazine/interviews/artist-interviews/canary-burton/.
 Fanfare Magazine, March/April 2012: 272.
 Pan Pipes: Sigma Alpha Iota Quarterly, 94–95 (2002): 24–25.
 Elizabeth Raum, "Canary Burton: Kaleidoscopic Connections," IAWM Journal 18, no. 2 (2012): 22–23.

External links
 Official site

1942 births
20th-century classical composers
21st-century American composers
21st-century classical composers
American women classical composers
American classical composers
American music educators
Living people
University of Idaho alumni
20th-century American women musicians
20th-century American musicians
20th-century American composers
21st-century American women musicians
Women music educators
20th-century women composers
21st-century women composers